Fausto Saraceni (1920–2000) was an Italian film producer and director.  He was married to the actress Teresa Pellati. He produced several comedies starring Alberto Sordi, and worked frequently with Dino De Laurentiis.

Selected filmography
 Brothers of Italy (1952)
 Gli undici moschettieri (1952)
 War and Peace (1956)
 Anyone Can Play (1968)
 Metello (1970)
 A Girl in Australia (1971)
 In Prison Awaiting Trial (1971)
 Il comune senso del pudore (1976)
 Strange Occasion (1976)
 Professor Kranz tedesco di Germania (1978)

References

Bibliography
 Chiti, Roberto & Poppi, Roberto. Dizionario del cinema italiano: Dal 1945 al 1959. Gremese Editore, 1991.
 Kezich, Tulio & Levantesi, Alessandra. Dino: The Life and the Films of Dino De Laurentiis. Miramax Books, 2004.
 Moore, Gene M. Conrad on Film. Cambridge University Press, 1997.

External links

1920 births
2000 deaths
Italian film directors
Italian film producers
People from Rome

it:Fausto Saraceni